William Jacob Richmond (born April 6, 2000) is an American professional soccer player who plays as a midfielder for Major League Soccer club San Jose Earthquakes.

Career

College and amateur 
Richmond played four years of college soccer at Stanford University between 2018 and 2021. As a member of Stanford Cardinal men's soccer he won Pac-12 Conference championships in 2018 and 2020, and made a College Cup appearance in the 2019 NCAA Division I tournament.

Professional 
On January 10, 2022, Richmond signed as a Homegrown Player for Major League Soccer side San Jose Earthquakes. He was the ninth homegrown signed by the Quakes in their history.

References

External links 

 

2000 births
Living people
American soccer players
Association football wingers
Stanford Cardinal men's soccer players
Homegrown Players (MLS)
Major League Soccer players
Sportspeople from San Francisco
San Jose Earthquakes players
Soccer players from California
MLS Next Pro players
De Anza Force players